Chungnam Asan Football Club is a South Korean football club based in Asan that competes in the K League 2, the second tier of South Korean football. They play their home games at Yi Sun-sin Stadium.

History 
In November 2019, it was announced that Asan Mugunghwa, the police football club in which the South Korean footballers served their two-year military duty, would be transformed into a civil football club, where non-South Korean foreign footballers would also be able to play. The club's new name, Chungnam Asan FC, along with a new crest, was officially revealed on 27 December 2019.

Squad

Current squad

Out on loan

See also
 Asan Mugunghwa FC

References

External links
Official website 

 
K League 2 clubs
Association football clubs established in 2020
2020 establishments in South Korea